Bjerkvik is a village in Narvik Municipality in Nordland county, Norway. The village is located at the end of Herjangsfjorden, an arm of Ofotfjorden.

The European route E6 and European route E10 highways meet in Bjerkvik, a central location on the roads connecting Harstad, Narvik, and Tromsø.  Elvegårdsmoen military camp lies on the eastern edge of the village near the lake Hartvikvatnet.

Bjerkvik School is a children's and secondary school in Bjerkvik in Narvik municipality in Nordland. The school has about 200 pupils.  The village also has two gas stations and three grocery stores. Bjerkvik Church was built here in 1955 to serve the northern part of the municipality.

History
During World War II, Bjerkvik was almost destroyed by the bombardment of gunfire from allied warships that caused significant civilian casualties.
A landing was also conducted in the area by a Franco-British forces, pushing the german forces several miles away.

The worst avalanche disaster in modern Norwegian history took place in Vassdalen near Bjerkvik in March 1986 when 16 Norwegian soldiers on exercise were killed.

Media gallery

References

Narvik
Villages in Nordland
Populated places of Arctic Norway